Hershey Country Club is a country club located in Hershey, Pennsylvania, which was founded in 1930 by Milton S. Hershey.

The golf course in the club hosted the PGA Championship in 1940, which Byron Nelson defeated Sam Snead on the par 3 12th hole in a playoff and won and the Hershey Open from 1933 to 1941. The club has two 18 hole golf courses; the 6,860-yard, par 73 West Course which was designed by Maurice McCarthy circa 1930, and the 7,061-yard, par-71 East Course which was designed by George Fazio in 1969. The PGA Championship was contested on the West Course and the LPGA Lady Keystone Open was held on the course for almost 20 years. The club also hosted a Nationwide Tour event for eight years and the Pennsylvania Open Championship 15 times.

Head golf pros at the club have included Hall of Famers Henry Picard (1934–41) and Ben Hogan (1941-51).

Professional Staff
The Hershey Country Club is under the management of Hershey Entertainment and Resorts. The General Manager is Jon Gehman. The professional staff includes Head Professionals Sara Muldoon and Robert Kreider, along with PGA Members Steve Bostdorf and Jeff Batchelor. In 2019 Muldoon and her staff were awarded the PGA National Merchandiser of the Year Award for the Resort Golf Category. They received their award at the PGA Show in Orlando, Florida, in January 2020.

Tournaments hosted
Hershey Open (PGA Tour) – 1933–39, 1941
PGA Championship – 1940
Lady Keystone Open (LPGA Tour) – 1978-94
Hershey Open/The Reese's Cup Classic (Nationwide Tour) – 1997-2004
Pennsylvania Open Championship – 1935, 1953–62, 1964–66, 1971-72
Pennsylvania State Athletic Conference championship
National Collegiate Athletic Association Division III - 2010
PGA Professional National Championship - 2011

References

External links
Official site

 

Buildings and structures in Dauphin County, Pennsylvania
Golf clubs and courses in Pennsylvania
Hershey Entertainment and Resorts Company
1930 establishments in Pennsylvania